Alisal is a Spanish word for "alder grove". It may refer to:

People
 Carlos Casado del Alisal (1833—1899), Spanish Argentine businessman
 José Casado del Alisal (1830/32–1886), Spanish portrait and history painter

Places
 Alisal, Salinas, California, a former unincorporated community, now part of Salinas
 Alisal, Pleasanton, California former Californio settlement, now part of Pleasanton, California

Other uses
 Alisal High School, Salinas, California
 Rancho El Alisal, a Mexican land grant in present-day Monterey County, California
 El Alisal, alternate name of the Lummis House in Los Angeles
 Alisal Creek, a tributary of the Santa Ynez River in Santa Barbara County, California